Cișmichioi is a commune and village in the Gagauz Autonomous Territorial Unit of the Republic of Moldova. The 2004 census listed the commune as having a population of 5,054 people.  4,772 inhabitants are Gagauz. Minorities included 43 Russians, 39 Ukrainians, 25 Bulgarians and 115 Moldovans.

Its geographical coordinates are 45° 32' 40" North, 28° 22' 58" East.

References

Communes of Gagauzia